College of Local Administration, Khon Kaen University or COLA is a degree-awarding college of Khon Kaen University (KKU), located in Khon Kaen, Thailand. The college was established on April 4, 2007, and now offers 5 degree programs: Bachelor of Public Administration in Local Government, Bachelor of Public Administration in Fiscal Management, Bachelor of Technology in Construction and Urban Management, Master of Public Administration in Local Government, and Doctor of Public Administration in Public Affairs Management.

List of deans 
 Associate Professor Dr. Peerasit Kamnuansilpa (2007–2011, 2020–present)
 Associate Professor Dr. Supawatanakorn Wongthanavasu (2011–2020)

References

External links
 College of Local Administration, Khon Kaen University

Khon Kaen University
University departments in Thailand